John Edward Crane (26 August 1913 – 5 January 1974) was an Australian rules footballer who played with Essendon,  Richmond and North Melbourne in the Victorian Football League (VFL).

Although recruited from Preston, Crane played originally for the South Melbourne seconds. He started his VFL career at Essendon and kicked five goals on his debut, against Hawthorn at Windy Hill.

A dispute with a teammate meant that he was cleared to Richmond after just one more league game and he was used as a full-back at his new club. He spent much of the 1940 VFL season as a key forward, kicking 21 goals. In the grand final that season he was Richmond's centre half-back, but couldn't prevent a 39-point loss.

Crane served with the Australian armed forces during the war, having enlisted in 1943. He returned to football in 1945, playing 17 games for North Melbourne.

He later coached the Caulfield Football Club.

Two brothers, Len and Tom Crane, were also league footballers.

References

1913 births
Essendon Football Club players
Richmond Football Club players
North Melbourne Football Club players
Preston Football Club (VFA) players
Australian rules footballers from Melbourne
1974 deaths
Caulfield Football Club coaches
Australian military personnel of World War II
Military personnel from Melbourne